The 2004 Missouri gubernatorial election was held on November 2, 2004 for the post of Governor of Missouri. The Republican nominee, Missouri Secretary of State Matt Blunt, defeated Democratic State Auditor Claire McCaskill. This gave the Republican Party control of both the governorship and the Missouri General Assembly for the first time in 80 years.

McCaskill had earlier defeated incumbent Governor Bob Holden in the Democratic primary. This was the first time a sitting Governor of Missouri had been defeated in a primary and the first time any United States governor had lost in a primary since the 1994 elections.

Coincidentally, McCaskill's mother Betty Anne had previously been defeated by Blunt's grandfather, Leroy Blunt, in a 1978 General Assembly election. Blunt's father Roy Blunt was a Congressman and served with McCaskill in the U.S. Senate from 2011 to 2019.

Republican primary

Campaign
Missouri Secretary of State Matt Blunt faced only token opposition in the Republican primary, easily defeating several lesser known opponents.

Results

Democratic primary

Campaign
Bob Holden had a difficult term as Missouri governor, starting at his inauguration on January 8, 2001, which cost $1 million, and which he struggled to pay for. The state economy suffered a downturn forcing him to make budget cuts and the Republican party gained control of the State Senate for the first time in 50 years. Holden was nicknamed by his opponents as "One Term Bob".

Holden announced that he would run for re-election in March 2003, blaming the Republican party for many of the problems during his term as governor. However, Holden was challenged by State Auditor Claire McCaskill for the Democratic nomination, who said that she would be a stronger candidate in the General election against Blunt.

McCaskill attacked Holden for delays in education funding, the state's deteriorating roads and increases in tuition fees at Missouri's universities. Holden sought to defend his term in office and attacked McCaskill for the people she accepted campaign contributions from. McCaskill picked up most newspaper endorsements during the primary and won the primary on August 3 against Holden.

Results

General election

Campaign
After the primaries finished Holden and McCaskill met to unite the Democratic party for the general election for what was always seen as being a close race against Blunt.

The first of two debates between Blunt and McCaskill was held on 18 October where McCaskill compared her experience to Blunt's inexperience; while Blunt said that McCaskill would not support the Marriage protection amendment to the State Constitution. In the two debates Blunt described himself as bringing change to Missouri  and was assisted by President George W. Bush during the campaign. McCaskill kept her distance from Democratic Presidential candidate John Kerry due to Bush's lead in Missouri.

In the end Blunt narrowly defeated McCaskill with surveys showing his conservative stance on social issues and the strong showing of President Bush in Missouri helped him to victory. Blunt obtained strong leads in the rural parts of the state, as well as the large cities of southwest Missouri, Springfield and Joplin,  which was sufficient to overcome McCaskill's leads in St. Louis and Jackson County. Blunt thus became Missouri's second youngest governor.

Predictions

Polling

Results

Notes

References

External links
Campaign websites (Archived)
Matt Blunt
Claire McCaskill

See also

Missouri
Governor
2004